Rebecca Lynne Rausch (born August 31, 1979) is an American attorney and politician from the commonwealth of Massachusetts. A member of the Democratic Party, she represents the Norfolk, Worcester and Middlesex district in the Massachusetts Senate.

Political career 
Becca Rausch served as an elected Needham Town Meeting member from 2017 to 2018. She was first elected to the state senate in November 2018. Rausch won her primary with 53% of the vote. She then defeated Republican incumbent Richard Ross with 51% of the vote.

Rausch's Committee assignments as a State Senator
 Joint Committee on Children, Families, and Persons with Disabilities
 Joint Committee on Elder Affairs
 Joint Committee on Municipalities and Regional Government
 Joint Committee on Public Health
 Joint Committee on Public Service
 Joint Committee on State Administration and Regulatory Oversight
 Joint Committee on Veterans and Federal Affairs

The Massachusetts Women's Political Caucus endorsed her as an incumbent candidate in the 2020 Massachusetts general election.

In 2022, Rausch won reelection over state Representative Shawn Dooley.

Personal life 
Rausch was raised in Albany, New York. She currently lives in Needham, Massachusetts with her husband and two children.

Career 
Rausch began her legal career by clerking for Judge Kenneth Laurence of the Massachusetts Appeals Court.

Education 
Rausch graduated from Brandeis University in 2001 with a bachelor's in American Studies and a minor in Women's Studies, then went on to earn her Juris Doctor from the Northeastern University School of Law in 2004. She later completed her Master of Laws from University of California, Berkeley in 2011 with a focus in women's health and reproduction and the law. She graduated Shaker High School in Latham, New York in 1997.

See also
 2019–2020 Massachusetts legislature
 2021–2022 Massachusetts legislature

References

External links

Living people
Democratic Party Massachusetts state senators
Brandeis University alumni
Northeastern University School of Law alumni
1979 births
21st-century American politicians
21st-century American women politicians